The 1996–97 season was the 49th season in Vardar’s history and their fifth in the Macedonian First League. Their 3rd-place finish in the 1995–96 season meant it was their 5th successive season playing in the First League.

Competitions

Overall

First League

Classification

Results by round

Matches

1 Match awarded to Sloga Jugomagnat because Vardar was fielded the suspended player.
2 Match abandoned after 86 minutes due to the crowd trouble. Sileks were awarded a 0–3 win, and Vardar was punished with the playing host games at the neutral venue in the rest of season.
Sources: RSSSF.no, Google Groups

Macedonian Football Cup

Group stage table

Matches

Source: Google Groups

UEFA Cup

References

FK Vardar seasons
Vardar